This timeline of prehistoric Scotland is a chronologically ordered list of important archaeological sites in Scotland and of major events affecting Scotland's human inhabitants and culture during the prehistoric period. The period of prehistory prior to occupation by the genus Homo is part of the geology of Scotland. Prehistory in Scotland ends with the arrival of the Romans in southern Scotland in the 1st century AD and the beginning of written records. The archaeological sites and events listed are the earliest examples or among the most notable of their type.

No traces have yet been found of either a Neanderthal presence or of Homo sapiens during the Pleistocene interglacials, the first indications of humans in Scotland occurring only after the ice retreated in the 11th millennium BC. Since that time, the landscape of Scotland has been altered dramatically by both human and natural forces. Initially, sea levels were lower than at present due to the large volume of ice that remained. This meant that the Orkney archipelago and many of the Inner Hebridean islands were attached to the mainland, as was the present-day island of Great Britain to Continental Europe. Much of the present-day North Sea was also dry land until after 4000 BC. Dogger Bank, for example was part of a large peninsula connected to the European continent. This would have made travel to western and northern Scotland relatively easy for early human settlers. The subsequent isostatic rise of land makes estimating post-glacial coastlines a complex task and there are numerous raised beaches around Scotland's coastline.

Many of the sites are located in the Highlands and Islands. This may be because of the relatively sparse modern populations and consequent lack of disturbance. Much of the area also has a thick covering of peat that preserves stone fragments, although the associated acidic conditions tend to dissolve organic materials. There are also numerous important remains in the Orkney archipelago, where sand and arable land predominate. Local tradition hints at both a fear and veneration of these ancient structures that may have helped to preserve their integrity.

Differentiating the various periods of human history involved is a complex task. The Paleolithic lasted until the retreat of the ice, the Mesolithic until the adoption of farming and the Neolithic until metalworking commenced. These events may have begun at different times in different parts of the country. A number of the sites span very long periods of time and in particular, the distinctions between the Neolithic and the later periods are not clear cut.

Timeline
Key to predominant "Type":

Citations in the Type box refer to the information in the entire row.

Palaeolithic
The whole of Scotland was covered in ice sheets during the coldest periods of the Quaternary glaciation and most of Scotland remained glaciated when the cave paintings of Lascaux in France were created, c. 14,000 BC. Humans began to populate Scotland during the current Flandrian interglacial but settlement began much later than in southern Europe due to the adverse climatic conditions further north. So far, a single site has produced the only definite evidence of Upper Paleolithic human habitation in Scotland.

Mesolithic
 

The Mesolithic period in Scotland is characterised by rich assemblages of lithic artefacts that indicate the presence of hunter-gatherer communities, most commonly identified by a narrow blade technology and its characteristic microliths. Most common raw material is flint beach pebbles, however, a variety of other types of geology, usually from local sources, is represented. Although stone tools and their production waste represent the vast majority of archaeological evidence form this period, Mesolithic material culture would have been dominated by organic materials (plant and animal materials) that require anaerobic preservation conditions to prevent decomposition (i.e. permafrost, peat bogs, etc.). Organic artefacts cannot survive in acidic soils of Scotland. However, Mesolithic bone artefacts have been found, surviving due to favourable preservation conditions – most are associated with the Obanian tradition. Other common organic finds are shell middens, including mollusc and fish bones, and charred remains, including hearths and hazelnut shells that can provide radiocarbon dates. Most prolific Mesolithic sites are discovered in coastal landscapes, however, this may be a result of research and recovery bias. No Mesolithic burial sites have been uncovered in Scotland to date. However, human remains have been discovered in the Oronsay middens. Additionally, a handful of Mesolithic dwelling sites have been discovered.

Neolithic

Scotland's Neolithic discoveries portray a radical departure from the earlier hunter-gatherer societies. During this period, complex societies evolve that are capable of creating substantial structures. Development is by no means linear and architectural advances are often followed by periods of stagnation and even reversal. The Balbridie site, for example, is matched by only two others so far discovered in Scotland at Kelso and in the Forth Valley and they are quite dissimilar from both anything found earlier and the monumental stone structures found later. No timber buildings of a similar size were re-created until the Saxon invasions some four millennia later. The great Orcadian Neolithic monuments were constructed contemporaneously with the emergence of the Ancient Egyptian culture, more than 500 years before the building of the Great Pyramid of Giza and almost a millennium before the sarsen stones of Stonehenge were erected.

Bronze and Iron Ages

From the commencement of the Bronze Age to about 2000 BC, the archaeological record shows a decline in the number of large new stone buildings constructed. Pollen analyses suggest that at this time woodland increased at the expense of the area under cultivation. In Orkney, burials were now being made in small cists well away from the great megalithic sites and a new Beaker culture began to dominate. Bronze and Iron Age metalworking was slowly introduced to Scotland from Europe over a lengthy period. (By contrast, the Neolithic monumental culture spread south from northern Scotland into England.) As the Bronze Age developed, Scotland's population grew to perhaps 300,000 in the second millennium BC.  There were evidently significant differences between the lifestyles of Bronze Age peoples inhabiting Scotland. For example, finds at the Traprain Law site (near modern Edinburgh) suggest that the priests there may have overseen ceremonies on a par with their contemporaries on mainland Europe. On the other hand, although the mummifications found at Cladh Hallan in the Western Isles invite comparisons with Egypt, the simple lifestyle of the inhabitants of this settlement contrasts with that of Tutankamun – even if the former's lives may have been preferable to those of the toiling slaves who built Amarna at this time.

During the 1st millennium BC as the Iron Age emerged from the preceding Bronze Age, it becomes legitimate to talk of a Celtic culture in Scotland, although the nature of the resident Pictish civilisation and their immediate predecessors remains enigmatic. The Stirling hoard was found by a metal detectorist in September 2009.  It has been described as the most significant discovery of Iron Age metalwork in Scotland and is said to be of international significance.

Sites of uncertain date

Various sites of importance are as yet undated and difficult to place in the timeline. Others contain items from many different periods whose story has not yet been unraveled or items where the time period and location cannot be easily reconciled. The Hirta and Burghead items may date from the Dark Ages some four centuries or more after the appearance of the Romans and the commencement of the historic era.

See also

 List of oldest buildings in the United Kingdom
 List of World Heritage Sites in Scotland
 Prehistoric Orkney
 Prehistoric Scotland
 Scotland during the Roman Empire
 Zenith of Iron Age Shetland

References and footnotes

Footnotes

General references
 
 
 
 
 
 .

External links

 
 
 

Prehistoric Scotland
Archaeology of Scotland
Scottish history timelines